February 4 - Eastern Orthodox liturgical calendar - February 6

All fixed commemorations below are observed on February 18  by Eastern Orthodox Churches on the Old Calendar.

For February 5th, Orthodox Churches on the Old Calendar commemorate the saints listed on January 23.

Feasts

 Afterfeast of the Meeting of our Lord in the Temple.

Saints

 Martyr Agatha of Catania in Sicily (251)
 Martyr Theodula of Anazarbus in Cilicia, and with her Martyrs Helladius, Macarius, Boethos, and Evagrius (304)
 Venerable Theodosius of Skopelos in Cilicia (c. 421)
 Saint Polyeuctus of Constantinople, Patriarch of Constantinople (970)
 Venerable Sabbas the New of Sicily, Abbot (995)

Pre-Schism Western saints

 Saint Agricola, the eleventh Bishop of Tongres in Belgium (420)
 Saint Avitus of Vienne, Bishop of Vienne, Gaul (520)
 Saints Genuinus (Ingenuinus), Bishop of Sabiona, and Albinus (7th century)
 Saint Bertulf of Renty (O.S.B.) (705)
 Saint Indract of Glastonbury (c. 710)  (see also: May 8)
 Saint Modestus, Bishop of Carinthia and Apostle of Carantania (c. 722)
 Saint Vodoaldus (Voel, Vodalus, Vodalis), born in Ireland, he went to France and reposed as a hermit near Soissons (c. 725)
 Saint Adelaide, Abbess of Vilich (c. 1015)
 Saint Agatha Hildegard of Carinthia, wife of the Count of Carinthia in Austria (1024)

Post-Schism Orthodox saints

 Saint Theodosius of Chernigov, Archbishop of Chernigov (1696)
 New Martyr Anthony of Athens, at Constantinople (1774)

New martyrs and confessors

 New Martyrs Matushka Agatha (Agafia) (1938), and with her Schemamonk Eugene (1939) and Righteous Paramon (1941), of Belorussia.
 Virgin-martyr Alexandra, and martyr Michael (1942)

Other commemorations

 Synaxis of the Icon of the Most Holy Theotokos "Eletsk-Chernigov" (1060)
 Synaxis of the Icon of the Most Holy Theotokos "Sicilian-Divnogorsky" ("the Rescuer of the Drowning") (1092)
 Synaxis of the Icon of the Most Holy Theotokos "Seeking of the Lost" (17th century)
 Repose of Metropolitan Michael (Jovanovich) of Serbia (1897)
 Repose of Valeriu Gafencu of Bessarabia, Romania (1952)
 Repose of Abbess Agnia of Nizhni-Novgorod (1954)

Icon gallery

Notes

References

Sources
 February 5 / 18. Orthodox Calendar (Pravoslavie.ru).
 February 18 / 5. Holy Trinity Russian Orthodox Church (A parish of the Patriarchate of Moscow).
 February 5. OCA - The Lives of the Saints.
 The Autonomous Orthodox Metropolia of Western Europe and the Americas. St. Hilarion Calendar of Saints for the year of our Lord 2004. St. Hilarion Press (Austin, TX). p. 13.
 The Fifth Day of the Month of February. Orthodoxy in China.
 February 5. Latin Saints of the Orthodox Patriarchate of Rome.
 The Roman Martyrology. Transl. by the Archbishop of Baltimore. Last Edition, According to the Copy Printed at Rome in 1914. Revised Edition, with the Imprimatur of His Eminence Cardinal Gibbons. Baltimore: John Murphy Company, 1916. pp. 38–39.
 Rev. Richard Stanton. A Menology of England and Wales, or, Brief Memorials of the Ancient British and English Saints Arranged According to the Calendar, Together with the Martyrs of the 16th and 17th Centuries. London: Burns & Oates, 1892. pp. 54-55.
Greek Sources
 Great Synaxaristes:  5 Φεβρουαρίου. Μεγασ Συναξαριστησ.
  Συναξαριστής. 5 Φεβρουαρίου. Ecclesia.gr. (H Εκκλησια Τησ Ελλαδοσ).
Russian Sources
  18 февраля (5 февраля). Православная Энциклопедия под редакцией Патриарха Московского и всея Руси Кирилла (электронная версия). (Orthodox Encyclopedia - Pravenc.ru).

February in the Eastern Orthodox calendar